Cheung Sha Wan is one of the 21 constituencies of the Sham Shui Po District Council. The seat elects one member of the council every four years. The boundary is loosely based on the area of Cheung Sha Wan and Sham Shui Po bounded by Pratas Street, Cheung Sha Wan Road, Yen Chow Street and Tai Po Road.

Councillors represented

1982 to 1985

1985 to 1994

1994 to present

Election results

2010s

2000s

1990s

1980s

References

2011 District Council Election Results (Sham Shui Po)
2007 District Council Election Results (Sham Shui Po)
2003 District Council Election Results (Sham Shui Po)
1999 District Council Election Results (Sham Shui Po)
 

Constituencies of Hong Kong
Constituencies of Sham Shui Po District Council
1982 establishments in Hong Kong
Constituencies established in 1982
Cheung Sha Wan
Sham Shui Po